Sammy Joe Odom (November 13, 1941 - January 18, 2001) was a professional football player, who played for the Houston Oilers in 1964.

Odom was born November 13, 1941, in Shreveport, Louisiana, and attended Minden High School in Minden, Louisiana, and then Northwestern State University, playing for the Northwestern State Demons football as a linebacker/defensive tackle in the Gulf States Conference. He was drafted in the seventh round of the 1964 NFL Draft with pick 95 by the Cleveland Browns and pick 78 in the tenth round of the  1964 AFL Draft by the Houston Oilers He opted to go to the Oilers and played fourteen games as a defensive tackle with the Oilers in 1964, making two interceptions for 22 yards. The following year he moved to the Richmond Rebels, as part of their inaugural team playing in the newly established Continental Football League. He did not play a game for the team and was delisted.

Odom died on January 18, 2001, in Mansfield, Louisiana.

References

1941 births
2001 deaths
People from Shreveport, Louisiana
Players of American football from Louisiana
American football linebackers
Northwestern State Demons football players
Houston Oilers players